Hypolite is a surname and a given name. People with the name include:

Chekira Lockhart Hypolite, Dominican politician
George Hypolite (born 1987), American football player
Hypolite Dupuis (1804–1879), Canadian fur trader
Hypolite Taremae (born 1968), Solomon Islands politician

See also
Florvil Hyppolite (1828–1896), Haitian general and president
Jean Hyppolite (1907–1968), French philosopher